The Wrythe is a district of Carshalton, South London, located in the London Borough of Sutton. The area is located 9.3 miles South of Charing Cross and is surrounded by the adjacent areas of Hackbridge and Croydon to the east, Morden and Mitcham to the north, Sutton to the west. The area is commonly referred to as Wrythe Green which is located at the centre of the neighbourhood. It is thought that the name derives from a spring which is related to the River Wandle which runs through the east of the area from the Carshalton ponds. The Wrythe had a population of 10,163 in the 2011 Census.

Toponymy and human history

The Place-names of Surrey notes the Anglo-Saxon Proto-Germanic  describes two high-gradient streams in the county (see The Rythe). The name is onomatopoeic, see ripple. It is a short, important tributary of the Wandle, as it receives water from potent springs.

The Wrythe area's history dates back to the Roman era. However, it remained largely undeveloped until the 18th century, with large development taking place in the 1930s. The population of the associated ward is 10,384 residents.

Facilities

Carshalton College is located in the Wrythe area, and it also contains four primary schools:
Victor Seymour Infants School
Camden Junior School
Muschamp Primary
Rushy Meadow Primary

Transport links
The Wrythe Green, traversed by short roads and surrounded by shops is centred 400 metres north of Carshalton railway station, the area is within walking distance of Hackbridge railway station and Mitcham Junction providing access to London Trams. The nearest London Underground station is Morden, which is two miles from the area. 

The area is served by the bus routes 127 to Tooting and Purley, 151 to Worcester Park and Wallington and 157 Morden, Croydon and Crystal Palace. The 151 serves the centre and main road of the Wrythe. whereas the 157 serves the M&S branch and the 127 serves the college.

References

Areas of London
Districts of the London Borough of Sutton